The M41 is a metropolitan route in the eThekwini Metropolitan Municipality, South Africa linking uMhlanga to Mount Edgecombe and Phoenix, north of the city of Durban.

Route 
The M41 begins at an interchange with the M4 highway in uMhlanga Rocks as a double-carriageway freeway (and for the entirety of its route) with motorists on the M41 only restricted to exit southbound on the M4 towards Durban. The M41 climbs up the ridge of uMhlanga in a northerly direction, bordering between Ridgeside and La Lucia Ridge and passing over the Ridgeside Drive interchange.

After Ridgeside, the M41 reaches the ridge of uMhlanga and heads in a northwesterly direction to pass under the M12 uMhlanga Rocks Drive. It proceeds to border between uMhlanga Ridge and La Lucia and then pass under the Millenium Way interchange before intersecting the N2 highway (to Durban and KwaDukuza) at the massive Mt Edgecombe Interchange.

After the N2, the M41 proceeds to enter into Mt Edgecombe, bordering the town to the north and passes under the Flanders Drive interchange. About a kilometre after Flanders Drive, the M41 ends at an interchange with the R102 (to Mt Edgecombe, Verulam and Phoenix- via Phoenix H'way) between Mt Edgecombe and Phoenix.

References

External links

 eThekwini Online - Roads Home Page

Highways in South Africa
Metropolitan Routes in Durban